Ghost Thief is the eighth studio album by the Christian metal band, Living Sacrifice. It is their second album produced by Jeremiah Scott.

Writing and recording
The band toured in support of their prior album, The Infinite Order, for three years before starting up work on recording a followup. The band chose to once again work with music producer Jeremiah Scott, with whom the band had collaborated on their previous album. The band started with writing the music, and then wrote lyrics once the music was already established.

Themes and composition
The album's title Ghost Thief is meant as "the personification of death". Conceptually, the album's lyrics explore the fleeting nature of life, the idea of an afterlife, and how death can be viewed as either "friend or foe" by different people in different circumstances. The tracks "Ghost Thief" and "Sudden" specifically were both inspired by family members of Lance Garvin and Rocky Gray, who died unexpectedly.

The album consists of songs that are mid to fast tempo thrash metal and groove metal, but also features more melodic guitar-work than prior albums as well. Many tracks on the album do not use standard verse-chorus song structures.

Reception

Specifying in a three star review by CCM Magazine, Matt Conner recognizes, "With blistering songs like 'Sudden' and the title track, it's clear these guys aren't hanging it up any time soon." David Stagg, indicating in a three star review from HM Magazine, realizes, "The album succeeds on most fronts, but if we’re judging on all the merits in between, the bulk of the tracks blend in." Signaling in a four star review for Jesus Freak Hideout, Timothy Estabrooks responds, "it is an excellent album filled with many masterfully-performed tracks and only a couple of disappointments." Lee Brown, mentioning for Indie Vision Music in a five star review, reports, "Ghost Thief is simply a powerhouse album that fans who have been waiting three long years to get their hands on will not mind coming back to in the coming year/s until the next great Living Sacrifice masterpiece is released." The second opinion by Aaron Lambert from Jesus Freak Hideout, where he rated the album four and a half stars, depicts, "Ghost Thief becomes yet another Christian metal classic from the godfathers of the genre itself."

Track listing

Personnel 

Living Sacrifice
Bruce Fitzhugh - lead vocals, rhythm guitar
Rocky Gray - lead guitar
 Arthur Green - bass, vocals
Lance Garvin - drums, percussion

Guest musicians
Ryan Clark - vocals on track 1
Dave Peters - vocals on track 10
Nick Hipa - lead guitar on track 3
Jeremiah Scott - acoustic intro on track 1
T.D. Benton - additional percussion on track 2
Josh Childers, Dustinn Lowery, Brad Hartley, Chris Bazor, Adam Phillips, and Loren Tew - Viking gang vocals

Production
Recorded by Jeremiah Scott, at Jeremiah Scott Production
Produced by Jeremiah Scott, Living Sacrifice
Mixed by Steve Blackmon
Art
Cover art by Travis Smith
Additional design by Ryan Clark of Invisible Creature
Photos by Jeremiah Scott

Charts

References

2013 albums
Living Sacrifice albums
Solid State Records albums